The Asiatic glassfishes are a family, the Ambassidae, of freshwater and marine fishes that were formerly classified in the order Perciformes, but most authorities consider this order to be paraphyletic and that the Ambassidae are of uncertain affinities, incertae sedis, but within the subseries Ovalentaria. The species in the family are native to Asia, Oceania, the Indian Ocean,  and the western Pacific Ocean.  The family includes eight genera and about 51 species.

The largest species reaches a maximum size around 26 cm (10 in). Many of the species are noted for their transparent or semitransparent bodies.

Several species are used as aquarium fish, noted for their transparent bodies. The Indian glassy fish (Parambassis ranga) is transparent, but showier specimens that had been injected with artificial coloring were sold as novelty pets in the 1990s. Since then, these "painted fish" have become much less popular, with more fishkeepers seeking naturally pigmented specimens.

Some species are known as perchlets.

Naming history
The family has also been called Chandidae, and some sources continue to use the name. Because Ambassidae was used first, in 1870, it has precedence over Chandidae, which was first used in 1905.

Timeline

References

 
Ovalentaria
Taxa named by Carl Benjamin Klunzinger